Eudalaca aurifuscalis is a species of moth of the family Hepialidae. It is known from South Africa. It was first described by Antonius Johannes Theodorus Janse in 1942.

References

External links
Hepialidae genera

Endemic moths of South Africa
Moths described in 1942
Hepialidae
Moths of Africa